The 2018 Arkansas Razorbacks baseball team (variously the OmaHogs or the Diamond Hogs) represented the University of Arkansas in baseball at the Division I level in the NCAA for the 2018 NCAA Division I baseball season.  They played their home games at Baum Stadium and are coached by Dave van Horn. They finished as the national runner-up after falling to Oregon State in three games at the 2018 College World Series.

Roster

Schedule and results

! style=""|Regular Season
|- valign="top" 

|-bgcolor=ccffcc
| Feb. 16 || * || #3 || Baum StadiumFayetteville, Arkansas || W 14–2 || B. Knight (1–0) || Van Hoose (0–1) || || 7,389 || 1–0 ||  
|-bgcolor=ccffcc
| Feb. 17 || Bucknell* || #3 || Baum Stadium || W 32–4 || I. Campbell (1–0) || Grabek (0–1) ||  || 7,862 || 2–0 ||
|-bgcolor=ccffcc
| Feb. 18 || Bucknell* || #3 || Baum Stadium || W 3–1 || M. Cronin (1–0) || Simpson (0–1) || J. Reindl (1) || 7,954 || 3–0 ||
|-bgcolor=ccffcc
| Feb. 21 || vs Arizona* || #3 || Tony Gwynn StadiumSan Diego, California || W 1–0 || K. Murphy (1–0) || Labaut (0–1) || M. Cronin (1) || 315 || 4–0 || 
|-bgcolor=ffcccc
| Feb. 23 || vs *† || #3 ||  || L 3–4 || Alvarez (1–0) || J. Reindl (0–1) || || 450 || 4–1 || 
|-bgcolor=ccffcc
| Feb. 24 || vs San Diego State*† || #3 ||  || W 5–2 || M. Cronin (2–0) || Ritcheson (0–1) || || 1,532 || 5–1 ||
|-bgcolor=ffcccc
| Feb. 25 || vs *† || #3 ||  || L 6–7 || Donatella (1–0) || E. Lee (0–1) || Friedman (1) || 675 || 5–2 ||
|-bgcolor=ccffcc
| Feb. 28 || * || #15 || Baum Stadium || W 18–1 || C. Bolden (1–0) || Wagner (0–1)||   || 6,897 || 6–2 ||
|-

|-bgcolor=ccffcc
| Mar. 1 || Dayton* || #15 || Baum Stadium || W 11–0 || B. Bonnin (1–0) || Cline (0–3) ||  || 6,836 || 7–2 ||
|-bgcolor=ccffcc
| Mar. 2 || * || #15 || Baum Stadium || W 4–0 || B. Knight (2–0) || Clarke (1–2) || J. Rutledge (1) || 8,142 || 8–2 || 
|-bgcolor=ffcccc
| Mar. 3 || USC* || #15 || Baum Stadium || L 1–3 || Longrie (2–0) || I. Campbell (1–1) || Lunn (5) || 13,472 || 8–3 ||
|-bgcolor=ccffcc
| Mar. 4 || USC* || #15 || Baum Stadium || W 7–6 8 || J. Rutledge (1–0) || Lunn (0–1) ||  || 7,388 || 9–3 ||
|-bgcolor=ccffcc
| Mar. 9 || * || #15 ||  || W 7–2 || B. Knight (3–0) || Kraus (1–2)||  || DH || 10–3 ||
|-bgcolor=ffcccc
| Mar. 9 || Kent State* || #15 ||  || L 4–10 || Havekost (1–0) || I. Campbell (1–2) ||  || 8,924 || 10–4 ||  
|-bgcolor=ccffcc
| Mar. 11 || Kent State* || #15 || Baum Stadium || W 11–4 || E. Lee (1–1) || Schultz (1–2) ||  || 3,049 || 11–4 ||
|-bgcolor=ccffcc
| Mar. 13 || Texas* || #18 || Baum Stadium || W 13–4 || K. Murphy (2–0) || Ridgeway (1–1) ||  || 8,051 || 12–4 ||
|-bgcolor=ccffcc
| Mar. 14 || Texas* || #18 || Baum Stadium || W 7–5 || C. Bolden (2–0) || O'Donnell (1–1) || M. Cronin (2) || 8,007 || 13–4 ||
|-bgcolor=ccffcc
| Mar. 16 || #8 Kentucky || #18 || Baum Stadium || W 9–4 || J. Reindl (1–1) || Hjelle (4–1) || M. Cronin (3) || 8,751 || 14–4 || 1–0
|-bgcolor=ccffcc
| Mar. 17 || #8 Kentucky ||#18||  || W 14–2 || I. Campbell (2–2) || Lewis (3–2) || || DH || 15–4 || 2–0
|-bgcolor=ccffcc
| Mar. 17 || #8 Kentucky ||#18||  || W 16–9 || K. Murphy (3–0) || Harper (1–1) || || 10,418 || 16–4 || 3–0
|-bgcolor=
| Mar. 20 || vs * ||#7|| BB&T BallparkCharlotte, North Carolina|| ||colspan=7|Cancelled
|-bgcolor=ffcccc
| Mar. 21 || at Charlotte* ||#7|| Hayes StadiumCharlotte, North Carolina || L 3–6 || Bruce (2–0) || K. Ramage (0–1) || Patten (2) || 815 ||  16–5 || 
|-bgcolor=ccffcc
| Mar. 23 || at #4 Florida ||#7|| McKethan StadiumGainesville, Florida || W 6–3 || B. Knight (4–0) || Singer (5–1) || M. Cronin (4) || 5,025 || 17–5 || 4–0
|-bgcolor=ffcccc
| Mar. 24 || at #4 Florida ||#7|| McKethan Stadium|| L 2–17 || Kowar (4–1) || I. Campbell (2–3) ||  || 4,815 || 17–6 || 4–1
|-bgcolor=ffcccc
| Mar. 25 || at #4 Florida ||#7|| McKethan Stadium || L 4–5 || Byrne (1–0) || K. Murphy (3–1) ||  || 4,510 || 17–7 || 4–2
|-bgcolor=ccffcc
| Mar. 27 || at * || #14 || FedExParkMemphis, Tennessee || W 8–7 || J. Rutledge (2–0) || Smith (1–1) ||  || 2,995 || 18–7 ||
|-bgcolor=ccffcc
| Mar. 29 || at #7 Ole Miss || #14 || Swayze FieldOxford, Mississippi || W 6–4 || B. Knight (5–0) || Rolison (3–3) || M. Cronin (5) || 9,619 || 19–7 || 5–2
|-bgcolor=ffcccc
| Mar. 30 || at #7 Ole Miss || #14 || Swayze Field || L 4–5 || Feigl (6–1) || E. Lee (1–2) || Caracci (5) || 10,648 || 19–8 || 5–3
|-bgcolor=ffcccc
| Mar. 31 || at #7 Ole Miss || #14 || Swayze Field || L 10–11 || McArthur (4–0) || K. Murphy (3–2) || Caracci (6) || 11,146 || 19–9 || 5–4
|-

|-bgcolor=ccffcc
| Apr. 3 || UL–Monroe* || #14 || Baum Stadium || W 10–9 10 || E. Lee (2–2) || Curtis (2–1) ||  || 6,682 || 20–9 || 
|-bgcolor=ccffcc
| Apr. 4 || UL–Monroe* || #14 || Baum Stadium || W 4–0 || C. Bolden (3–0) || Hebert (2–2) ||  || 6,963 || 21–9 || 
|-bgcolor=ccffcc
| Apr. 6 ||  || #14 || Baum Stadium || W 2–1 || B. Knight (6–0) || Mize (6–1) || M. Cronin (6) || 8,609 || 22–9 || 6–4
|-bgcolor=ccffcc
| Apr. 7 || Auburn || #14 || Baum Stadium || W 13–2 || K. Murphy (4–2) || Daniel (2–2) ||  || 9,817 || 23–9 || 7–4 
|-bgcolor=ccffcc
| Apr. 8 || Auburn || #14 || Baum Stadium || W 5–4 || J. Reindl (2–1) || Greenhill (1–1) ||  || 7,530 || 24–9 || 8–4
|-bgcolor=ccffcc
| Apr. 10 || vs * || #7 || Dickey-Stephens ParkNorth Little Rock, Arkansas || W 7–6 || J. Rutledge (3–0) || Baduel (2–2) || M. Cronin (7) || 8,719 || 25–9 ||
|-bgcolor=ffcccc
| Apr. 12 || South Carolina || #7 || Baum Stadium || L 2–3 || Bridges (2–0) || B. Loseke (0–1) || Demurias (3) || 8,416 || 25–10 || 8–5 
|-bgcolor=ccffcc
| Apr. 14 || South Carolina || #7 ||  || W 2–0 7 || K. Murphy (5–2) || Hill (3–4) || M. Cronin (8) || DH || 26–10 || 9–5      
|-bgcolor=ccffcc
| Apr. 14 || South Carolina || #7 ||  || W 3–0 7 || I. Campbell (3–3) || Morris (6–3) || M. Cronin (9) || 9,680 || 27–10 || 10–5 
|-bgcolor=ccffcc
| Apr. 17 || * || #6 || Baum Stadium || W 11–7 || K. Ramage (1–1) || Fromson (2–2) || J. Reindl (2) || 7,983 || 28–10 || 
|-bgcolor=ffcccc
| Apr. 20 || at Mississippi State || #6 || Dudy Noble FieldStarkville, Mississippi || L 5–6 || France (2–1) || M. Cronin (2–1) ||  || 7,303 || 28–11 || 10–6  
|-bgcolor=ffcccc
| Apr. 21 || at Mississippi State || #6 || Dudy Noble Field || L 3–5 || Small (4–3) || K. Murphy (5–3) || Smith (3) || DH || 28–12 || 10–7   
|-bgcolor=ffcccc
| Apr. 21 || at Mississippi State || #6 || Dudy Noble Field || L 5–7 || Billingsley (3–2) || I. Campbell (3–4) || Neff (1) || 10,147 || 28–13 || 10–8 
|-bgcolor=ccffcc
| Apr. 24 || #11 Texas Tech* || #10 || Baum Stadium || W 5–1 || E. Lee (3–2) || Sublette (0–2) || B. Loseke (1) || 8,455 || 29–13 ||
|-bgcolor=
| Apr. 25 || #11 Texas Tech* || #10 || Baum Stadium ||colspan=8|Cancelled
|-bgcolor=ccffcc
| Apr. 27 || Alabama || #10 || Baum Stadium || W 7–3 || B. Knight (7–0) || Finnerty (4–3) || J. Reindl (3) || 10,835 || 30–13 || 11–8
|-bgcolor=ccffcc
| Apr. 28 || Alabama || #10 || Baum Stadium || W 7–4 || E. Lee (4–2) || Guffey (1–2) || B. Loseke (2) || 10,846 || 31–13 || 12–8
|-bgcolor=ccffcc
| Apr. 29 || Alabama || #10 || Baum Stadium || W 9–7 || B. Loseke (1–1) || Duarte (3–3) || J. Reindl (4) || 9,265 || 32–13 || 13–8
|-

|-bgcolor=ccffcc
| May 4 || at LSU || #6 || Alex Box StadiumBaton Rouge, Louisiana || W 5–4 || B. Loseke (2–1) || Bush (0–1)  || J. Reindl (5) || 10,776 || 33–13 || 14–8
|-bgcolor=ffcccc
| May 5 || at LSU || #6 || Alex Box Stadium || L 4–6 || Fontenot (1–0) || K. Murphy (5–4) || Peterson (2) || 10,948 || 33–14 || 14–9  
|-bgcolor=ffcccc
| May 6 || at LSU || #6 || Alex Box Stadium || L 5–7 || Labas (6–1) || I. Campbell (3–5) || Beck (1) || 10,932 || 33–15 || 14–10
|-bgcolor=ccffcc
| May 11 ||  || #6 || Baum Stadium || W 9–3 || B. Knight (8–0) || Kilkenny (8–3) ||  || 9,826 || 34–15 || 15–10 
|-bgcolor=ccffcc
| May 12 || #23 Texas A&M || #6 || Baum Stadium || W 3–1 || K. Murphy (6–4) || Doxaxis (6–4) || B. Loseke (3) || 9,989 || 35–15 || 16–10
|-bgcolor=ccffcc
| May 13 || #23 Texas A&M || #6 || Baum Stadium || W 6–3 || I. Campbell (4–5) || Kolek (5–5) ||  || 8,538 || 36–15 || 17–10
|-bgcolor=ccffcc
| May 17 || at  || #5 || Foley FieldAthens, Georgia || W 8–6 || B. Knight (9–0) || Locey (6–2) || M. Cronin (10) || 2,222 || 37–15 || 18–10
|-bgcolor=ffcccc
| May 18 || at #8 Georgia || #5 || Foley Field || L 7–8 10 || Schunk (2–1) || B. Loseke (2–2) ||  || 2,331 || 37–16 || 18–11
|-bgcolor=ffcccc
| May 19 || at #8 Georgia || #5 || Foley Field || L 2–3 || Smith (8–1) || E. Lee (4–3) || Webb (3) || 2,337 || 37–17 || 18–12
|-

|-
! style=""|Postseason
|- 

|-bgcolor=ccffcc
| May 23 || #14 South Carolina || #9 || Hoover Metropolitan StadiumHoover, Alabama || W 13–8 || K. Murphy (7–4)|| Chapman (5–5) ||  || 6,710 || 38–17 || 1–0
|-bgcolor=ccffcc
| May 25 || #2 Florida || #9 || Hoover Metropolitan Stadium || W 8–2 || B. Knight (10–0) || Kowar (9–4) || M. Cronin (11) || 1,384 || 39–17 || 2–0
|-bgcolor=ffcccc
| May 26 || LSU || #9 || Hoover Metropolitan Stadium || L 1–2 || Hess (7–5) || I. Campbell (4–6) || Bush (2) || 10,381 || 39–18 || 2–1
|-

|-bgcolor=ccffcc
| June 1 || Oral Roberts || #10 || Baum Stadium || W 10–2 || B. Knight (11–0)|| McGregor (6–2) ||  || 9,215 || 40–18 || 1–0
|-bgcolor=ccffcc
| June 2 || Southern Miss || #10 || Baum Stadium || W 10–2 || K. Murphy (8–4) || Powers (5–2) ||  || 10,213 || 41–18 || 2–0
|-bgcolor=ccffcc
| June 3 || Dallas Baptist || #10 || Baum Stadium || W 4–3 || J. Reindl (3–1) || Funderburk (1–3) || M. Cronin (12) || 9,715 || 42–18 || 3–0
|-

|-bgcolor=ccffcc
| June 9 || #10 South Carolina || #4 || Baum Stadium || W 9–3 || B. Knight (12–0) || Demurias (7–1) || B. Loseke (4) || 11,722 || 43–18 || 1–0  
|-bgcolor=ffcccc
| June 10 || #10 South Carolina || #4 || Baum Stadium || L 5–8 || Morris (9–3) || K. Murphy (8–5) || Bridges (5) || 11,481 || 43–19 || 1–1 
|-bgcolor=ccffcc
| June 11 || #10 South Carolina || #4 || Baum Stadium || W 14–4 || B. Loseke (3–2) || Mlodzinski (3–6)  ||  || 11,217 || 44–19 || 2–1 
|-

|-bgcolor=ccffcc
| June 17 || #13 Texas || #5 || TD Ameritrade Park OmahaOmaha, Nebraska || W 11–5 || B. Knight (13–0) || Kingham (8–5)  ||  || 23,034 || 45–19 || 1–0 
|-bgcolor=ccffcc
| June 20 || #9 Texas Tech || #5 || TD Ameritrade Park Omaha || W 7–4 || B. Loseke (4–2) || Martin (7–6) ||  || 13,637 || 46–19 || 2–0
|-bgcolor=ccffcc
| June 22 || #1 Florida || #5 || TD Ameritrade Park Omaha || W 5–2 || I. Campbell (5–6) || Singer (12–3) || M. Cronin (13) || 25,016 || 47–19 || 3–0
|-bgcolor=ccffcc
| June 26  || #3 Oregon State || #5 ||  || W 4–1 || B. Knight (14–0) || Heimlich (16–3) || M. Cronin (14) || 25,321 || 48–19 || 4–0
|-bgcolor=ffcccc
| June 27 || #3 Oregon State || #5 ||  || L 3–5 || Abel (7–1) || M. Cronin (2–2) || Mulholland (16) || 25,580 || 48–20 || 4–1
|-bgcolor=ffcccc
| June 28 || #3 Oregon State || #5 ||  || L 0–5 || Abel (8–1) || I. Campbell (5–7) ||  || 19,323 || 48–21 || 4–2
|-

| style="text-align:left;" |

NCAA tournament

Fayetteville Regional

Fayetteville Super Regional

College World Series

First round

Second round

Semifinals

First inning — The Gators started the game in the field; Florida pitcher Brady Singer started on the mound. Casey Martin achieved the Hogs' first hit with a single to left field. Third to bat for Arkansas was Heston Kjerstad, who flew out to right field, but advanced Martin to second in the process. Arkansas' fourth hitter was designated hitter Luke Bonfield, who, on the at bat's tenth pitch, singled to center field, scoring Martin to make it 1–0 Hogs.

Isaiah Campbell started on the mound for the Hogs. Florida's Deacon Liput flew out to short to begin the inning; Nelson Maldonado grounded out to first two pitches later. Third in the lineup for the Gators was third baseman Jonathan India, who struck out after chasing a 2–2 pitch outside, ending the inning. Arkansas 1, Florida 0

Second inning — Carson Shaddy and Jared Gates both grounded out to give Florida a quick two outs. Catcher Grant Koch walked on a 3–2 pitch, and advanced to second on a Jax Biggers single to right field. On the next pitch, Eric Cole, the Hogs' first hitter, grounded to first for the third out.

Isaiah Campbell retired three straight batters in the bottom of the second with three strikeouts in a row, putting him at four on the night and ending the inning. Arkansas 1, Florida 0

Third inning — Casey Martin delivered his second hit of the game to start the third, a single to left. Heston Kjerstad got to first and advanced Martin to second on an error after Blake Reese dropped a grounder. Dominic Fletcher batted in Arkansas' second RBI with a single to right, advancing Kjerstad to third. Carson Shaddy struck out and Jared Gates grounded out to end the top of the 3rd.

Second baseman Blake Reese flew out to start the inning for the Gators. Campbell struck out Brady Smith for the second out and Nick Horvath for the third, ending the inning and putting his tally at six. Arkansas 2, Florida 0

Fourth inning — Grant Koch flew out to short to begin the fourth inning. Jax Biggers followed by flying out to left field for the second out, and Eric Cole grounded out to short, quickly ending the inning for the Gators defense.

Deacon Liput was first up for Florida in the fourth; his fly ball to center was the first time the Gators had left the infield on a swing. Maldonado grounded to short for the second out, and Jonathan India popped up to first for the third. Arkansas 2, Florida 0

Fifth inning — Arkansas' Casey Martin became 3-for-3 with a double to left field. Kjerstad was next up; his groundout to first advanced Martin to third. Luke Bonfield delivered the Hogs' third RBI on the next AB, and Dominic Fletcher followed that up with a solo home run to right field, the game's first.

Florida's first hit came with two outs in the bottom of the fifth, as Austin Langworthy singled to center field. Campbell hit the next batter to put runners on first and second. Brady Smith, Florida's next hitter, gave the Gators their first RBI with a single to center, putting runners on the corners. Florida's second run came via a wild pitch, as Blake Reese came in to score from home. Campbell then struck out Nick Horvath, forcing the Gators to strand one runner and ending the inning. Arkansas 4, Florida 2

Sixth inning — Following 89 pitches and 2 strikeouts, Florida elected to pull Brady Singer from the game and put Tommy Mace on the mound. On Mace's second pitch, Jared Gates singled to left field for the Hogs' eighth hit of the night. Jax Biggers took advantage of a wild throw to first on his hit, advancing to second and moving Gates to third. Casey Martin continued a good night with a single and another Razorback RBI, putting runners on the corners. Unfortunately for the Hogs, 2 runners were stranded when Kjerstad chased a pitch in the dirt for the third out.

Deacon Liput reached base after a wild throw to first, Arkansas' first error of the game. After throwing 85 pitches and recording 8 strikeouts in  innings, Isaiah Campbell exited the game and right-hander Jake Reindl took the mound. Reindl's first pitch resulted in a fly-out to center, as did his ninth, which ended the inning. Arkansas 5, Florida 2

Seventh inning — First up for Arkansas was Luke Bonfield; he grounded out to short for the inning's first out. The second came several pitches later as Dominic Fletcher popped up to center field. Carson Shaddy struck out on a 1–2 pitch to end the inning moments later, marking the second inning of the game without an Arkansas runner on base.

The first pitch of the bottom of the seventh resulted in a fly-out to left field. Two Florida batters then walked, but Reindl regained his confidence to finish the inning with a strikeout and a groundout to third, stranding two Gator batters. Arkansas 5, Florida 2

Eighth inning — Jared Gates and Grant Koch provided two quick outs before Jax Biggers found center field for a single. However, Biggers ended the inning stranded after Eric Cole was thrown out at first several pitches later.

Reindl was taken out of the game, having thrown 27 pitches (with 1 strikeout), and left-handed closer Matt Cronin took the mound. On his fifth pitch, leadoff hitter Deacon Liput ripped a single to right for his first hit of the night and the Gators' third. A fly ball to left field that found the glove of Heston Kjerstad was the source of the first out, with the second coming on a called strike three to Jonathan India and the third coming a pitch later on a fly ball to deep center field. Arkansas 5, Florida 2

Ninth inning — The ninth inning began with Casey Martin popping up, the first time on the night he had not reached base. Heston Kjerstad flew out to center two pitches later, ending his night at 0–5. Luke Bonfield singled to center on the next pitch, his second hit of the night. Several pitches later, however, Dominic Fletcher was thrown out at first, putting the game in the hands of his defense.

The bottom of the ninth began with a long, fly ball to right field; the ball was caught by Eric Cole in foul territory for the first out. The next batter up was Austin Langworthy, who grounded out to first for the second out. Matt Cronin then delivered his second strikeout of the game on a 0–2 pitch, retiring Blake Reese and ending the game, sending Arkansas to the College World Series Championship Series for the first time since 1979. Arkansas 5, Florida 2

CWS Championship Series

Game 1

Game 1 of the CWS Championship series was originally scheduled for June 25 at 6:00 p.m. CDT, but it was postponed to June 26 due to inclement weather following a 97–minute delay.

Game 2

Game 3

Record vs. conference opponents

2018 MLB Draft

References

Arkansas
Arkansas Razorbacks baseball seasons
Arkansas baseball
Arkansas
College World Series seasons